Street Girls is a low budget 1975 exploitation film directed by Michael Miller and starring Carol Case and Paul Pompian. The script was co-written by Barry Levinson.

Plot

See also
 List of American films of 1975

References

External links

1975 films
1970s exploitation films
Films shot in Eugene, Oregon
1970s crime drama films
1975 drama films
1975 directorial debut films
Films directed by Michael Miller (director)
1970s English-language films
American exploitation films
American crime drama films
1970s American films